Wanted is an Australian drama television series which premiered on the Seven Network in Australia on 9 February 2016. The first season consisted of six episodes. It was renewed for a six-episode second season, which premiered with a double-episode on 5 June 2017. The series was renewed for a third and final season which premiered on 15 October 2018.

Plot 
Two women, Lola and Chelsea, are waiting at a suburban bus stop before midnight. A car crashes in front of them, and two masked men arrive and shoot the driver dead. Lola struggles with the masked attacker and the gun goes off, killing him. The other man is unmasked and he takes them both hostage. They escape but are caught up in a larger criminal conspiracy, and go on the run across Australia in a vehicle filled with cash. They are chased by criminals and corrupt police, being able to trust only each other. The end of season 1 seems to end with a resolution until Lola receives a disturbing call.

Season 2 finds the women in both Thailand and New Zealand as they try to save a kidnapped family member. Their bravery cost them their freedom, setting the stage for Season 3 which starts off with them being incarcerated. The women choose freedom through witness protection but trouble once again finds Lola where she decides to track down Chelsea, and the two go off on another run, while being relentlessly pursued by Detective Max Middleton. They come across a group of dangerous people involved in a human smuggling operation, choosing once again to risk their lives and freedom to be able help people begging for their help.

Cast 
 Rebecca Gibney as Lola Buckley
 Geraldine Hakewill as Chelsea Babbage
 Stephen Peacocke as Detective Josh Levine
 Kate Box as Detective Maxine "Max" Middleton (season 3)
 Ryan Corr as Chris Murphett (season 1)
 Nicholas Bell as Ray Stanton
 Mirko Grillini as Terry Boke (season 1)
 Todd Levi as Ebert (season 1)
 Nicholas Hamilton as Jamie (season 1)
 Veronica Neave as Karen Stanton
 Anthony Phelan as Kelvin "Kel" Morrison
 Charles Cottier as David Buckley
 Dean O'Gorman as Will Johnson (season 2)
 Robyn Malcolm as Donna Walsh, Lola's sister
 Kerry Fox as Susan Carpenter (season 3)
 Clarence Ryan as Hamish, Max's partner (season 3)
 Michael Whalley as Lance Greiner (season 3)
 Rob Carlton as Karl Brady (season 3)
 Sarah Milde as Lucie 
 Alex Malone as Sophie (season 3)
 Paul Gleeson as Tom McKaw, Max's superior (season 3)
 Neil Fanning as Roadhouse Cop
 Ian Bliss as Luke Delaney
 Steven Rooke as Jackson Delaney
 Ian Mune as Jim Walsh
 Catherine Wilkin as Beverley Delaney
 Edmund Lembke-Hogan as Constable McKenzie
 Pat Thomson as Motel owner
 Paul Bishop as Bernie
 Alex Dimitriades as Anton Maric
 Christopher Sommers as Dirk
 Simon Mallory as Sergeant Hunt
 Narelle King as Dixie Boulevard

Episodes

Season 1 (2016)

Season 2 (2017)

Season 3 (2018)

Production 
The series was first announced in August 2015 following an undisclosed funding amount from Screen Australia and investment of AU$27,768 from Screen Queensland. The series was filmed in various locations in Queensland. Shirley Barrett was initially named as director, but Peter Templeman and Jennifer Leacey were later named. The series is created by husband and wife Rebecca Gibney and Richard Bell, co-founders of R&R Productions which is the production company behind the series, along with Matchbox Pictures. The series will be distributed internationally by Universal Media Studios International.

Production began in September 2015 and wrapped in early December, totalling 10 weeks in 60 locations. In August 2016, it was confirmed that Wanted had been renewed for a second season of six episodes filmed in Australia, New Zealand, and Thailand.

Promotion 
The Seven Network released a 90-second promo in December 2015, advising the series would begin airing in February 2016. The premiere date was later confirmed as 9 February.

Ratings

Season 1 (2016) 
The first season averaged 1.24 million viewers and was the highest rated Australian drama series of 2016.

Season 2 (2017)

Season 3 (2018)

Home media

Awards and nominations

References

External links 
 
 

2010s Australian crime television series
2010s Australian drama television series
2016 Australian television series debuts
2018 Australian television series endings
English-language television shows
Seven Network original programming
Television series by Matchbox Pictures
Television shows filmed in Australia
Television shows filmed in New Zealand
Television shows filmed in Thailand
Television shows set in Australia
Television shows set in New Zealand
Television shows set in Thailand